The Lisbon tramway network is a system of trams that serves Lisbon, capital city of Portugal.  In operation since 1873, it presently  comprises six lines. The system has a length of 31 km, and 63 trams in operation (45 historic "Remodelados", 8 historic "Ligeiros" and 10 modern articulated trams). The depot is located in Santo Amaro, in Alcântara.

History

Origin
Lisbon's municipal government wished to develop urban transit and granted concessions to build and operate various systems that included funiculars and tramways.  The first tramway in Lisbon entered service on 17 November 1873 as a horsecar line.  The vehicles, called americanos after their point of origin, were initially deployed in the flat parts of the city where animals were capable of hauling their passenger loads.

Cable trams
To surmount the steep slopes where draft animal conveyance was impossible, funiculars were envisioned in proposals made to the municipal government in 1882.  The first of them started operating in 1884.  This inaugurated the era of cable-driven transport, but the technology of electrical generation, transmission and power was developing concurrently and would eventually supersede it.

Cable tram services (or cable cars) afforded an alternative to funiculars for the longer and curved routes required to follow Lisbon's streets.  Individual vehicles grasp a steel cable that runs continuously in a channel below the roadway surface.  The transport company that ran the funiculars applied for and received the concessions to operate cable trams and from 1890 initially proposed two routes based on plans by the Portuguese engineer Raoul Mesnier du Ponsard, who had already designed Lisbon's funiculars.  In all, three lines operated in the city.  Each had a  gauge, corresponding to that of the extant americanos.  The rolling stock on the Estrela and Graça lines were built by Maschinenfabrik Esslingen; the São Sebastião cars apparently were designed by Maschinenfabrik Esslingen but built in Portugal.

Elevador da Estrela

At the Estrela terminal, the company set up a small depot where the steam-operated powerhouse was also located. Rolling stock consisted of a tug and trailer. Since single-ended vehicles were used on the Estrela route, there was a turntable there and a turning loop (raquette) at Praça Camões. The service ran until 1913 when it was rendered economically unviable by competing electric trams. Its former route is now part of 28E's.

Elevador da Graça

It was opened on 26 March 1893. The depot and powerhouse were at the Graça terminal. The Graça route was served by bidirectional vehicles. Service ended in 1913 but part of the route was revived in 1915 and continues to operate as an electric tram line (12E).

Elevador de São Sebastião
On 15 January 1899 a third cable tram line started operating under a different concession from the other two. The depot and powerhouse were in Palhavá (São Sebastião). It also ran for the shortest time of any of the lines, suffering bankruptcy in 1901.

Electrification and modern era

On 30 August 1901, Lisbon's first electric tramway commenced operations. Within a year, all of the city's americano routes had been converted to electric traction, and by 1913 the cable trams were retired.

Until 1959, the network of lines continued to be developed, and in that year it reached its greatest extent. At that time, there were 27 tram lines in Lisbon, of which six operated as circle lines.  As the circle lines operated in both clockwise and anticlockwise directions, each with its own route number, it is more correct to speak of a total of 24 tram routes, all of them running on  narrow gauge tram lines.

The slow decline of the network began with the construction of the Lisbon Metro and the expansion of the bus system.

Current network

The current lines are:
12 - Praça da Figueira → Miradouro de Santa Luzia circular route (clockwise only)
15 - Praça da Figueira ↔ Belém ↔ Algés
18 - Cais do Sodré railway station ↔ Cemitério da Ajuda
24 - Praça Luís de Camões ↔ Campolide
25 - Praça da Figueira ↔ Campo de Ourique (Prazeres)
28 - Praça Martim Moniz ↔ Graça ↔ Estrela ↔ Campo de Ourique (Prazeres)

The six remaining lines operate in the southern city centre and west of the city only. Aside from the obvious tourist attraction, those lines are still important because sections of the city's topography can only be crossed by small trams. Tram 15 also connects the entire western riverfront of the city to the centre and allows a better link for passengers with the bus system towards an area that still is not served by the metro.

Although reports prepared by both the École Polytechnique Fédérale de Lausanne and the Verkehrsbetriebe Zürich concluded that the network should be retained and even extended, the process of decline continued until 1997, with the closing of the Alto de São João branch and the Arco Cego depot. By that time, many trams were destroyed or sold to other companies. In the following twenty years, there was only one change to the system, the shortening of Line 18 to Cais do Sodré.

Expansion

In an apparent reversal of policy, the mayor (president of the city council) of Lisbon, Fernando Medina, announced in December 2016 that tram 24 would be restored to service in 2017 between Cais do Sodré and Campolide, saying that it was a mistake to reduce the city's network of electric trams and that work would be undertaken to reconstruct it.

Carris originally said this was not a priority, but its 2018 Activity and Budget Plan provides for the purchase in 2020-2021 of:
 10 more remodelados to augment the current historical fleet and reopen line 24 between Cais do Sodré and Campolide, at a cost of €8 million;
 20 more articulated trams to extend line 15 eastwards to Santa Apolónia station and the Parque das Nações, at a cost of €50 million.

On 24 April 2018, Line 24 was reopened, albeit initially between Camões and Campolide only. Track connections to the rebuilt loop at Cais do Sodré and some other track issues between Camões and Cais do Sodré will need to be attended to before operation to Cais do Sodré is possible.

In July 2021 agreement was reached for two further extensions:
 a 12.1 km U-shaped surface metro connecting the terminus of the yellow line at Odivelas to the Hospital Beatriz Ângelo in one direction and Loures in the other;
 an additional 24 km of line on route 15, extending it to Linda-a-Velha in the west and to Sacavém in the north-east.

Rolling stock
The tram fleet has fallen in size from 57 in 2012 to 48 in 2016. Vehicles used are:
'Articulado' trams made by Siemens (Siemens/CAF nos 501-506 and Siemens/Sorefame nos 507–510). These articulated vehicles were introduced in 1995 and run only on route 15.
'Remodelado' trams (nos 541–585) used on all routes.
Tourist trams used on some routes.

See also

Ascensor da Bica
Ascensor da Glória
Ascensor do Lavra
 Carris
List of town tramway systems in Portugal

References

Notes

Books

Website

External links

 Tram 28 in Lisbon
 Tram 28 route on Google Map
 Lisbon Metro Map

This article is based on a translation of the German language version as of March 2011.

Lisbon
Transport in Lisbon
Lisbon
900 mm gauge railways in Portugal
600 V DC railway electrification
1873 establishments in Portugal